Yseop (pronounced 'Easy-Op') is a French software company, specializing in no code intelligent report automation, using natural language generation (NLG). Established in 2000 with offices in Paris, New York, Lyon and Bogota.

History 
Yseop was established in 2000 by Alain Kaeser, based on his research at the École normale supérieure Paris-Saclay (formerly ENS Cachan). Research and development for Yseop's technology began in the mathematical lab École normale supérieure de Cachan.  
The company was co-founded with John Rauscher, after he sold his start-up called Sunopsis to Oracle in 2006.

Yseop first commercialized its product as a middleware at the end of 2008 and opened up its American subsidiary in Dallas, Texas in 2012.

The Yseop Team 
Former and current Yseop executives include Emmanuel Walckenaer (current CEO), John Rauscher (former CEO), Matthieu Andre (former CFO and currently at Groupe PSIH), Maxine Azoulay (former US CTO and formerly of Meero and now at Airship) and Arden Manning (formerly at the DNC and currently cofounder of Nituno.) Alain Kaeser, Yseop's founder has been with the company since 2000 and continues to lead its strategic planning.

Products 
Yseop commercializes natural language generation (NLG) software, which reasons on data and turns it into written recommendations and reports.

Yseop's software writes in English, Spanish, French and German. 

Yseop has worked with Société Générale.

Recognition 
In 2014, Tom Austin, vice president and fellow at Gartner, cited Yseop, Narrative Science and Automated Insights as part of the Smart Machine, technological revolution that "has the promise to be one of the most disruptive changes ever".

See also 
Natural language generation
Natural language processing

References

External links 

Software companies of France
Companies established in 2000
Natural language generation